Davao Doctors College (DDC) is a private and non-sectarian academic institution in Davao City, Philippines. College was founded in 1975 and supports House of Hopes.

History
Davao Doctors College (DDC), formerly known as the Davao Doctors Hospital School of Nursing (DDHSN), was the brainchild of a group of medical doctors in response to the increasing demand for nurses in Davao Doctors Hospital.

DDC was originally housed within the hospital premises and offered only the three-year Basic Course in Nursing leading to graduate nurse. There were 52 students in the first batch of enrollees, 32 of whom eventually graduated. One hundred percent of the batch passed the Nurse Licensure Exam in 1978.

In 1979, DDHSN expanded its curricular offerings. The Graduate Nurse Program was upgraded to a Bachelor of Science in nursing. Bachelor of Science in biology and pre-dentistry opened in the same year.

1981 – DDHSN was officially named Davao Doctors College
1990 – Offered BS Physical Therapy and BS Radiologic Technology
1994 – Offered Doctor of Optometry
1998 – Opened non-health related courses: BS Psychology, BS Hotel and Restaurant Management, BS Computer Science and AB Communication Arts
2000 – Start of accreditation by the Philippine Association of Colleges and Universities-Commission on Accreditation (PACUCOA)
2001 – Offered Bachelor of Elementary Education and Bachelor of Secondary Education
2009 – Offered Bachelor of Science in Occupational Therapy
2009 – Offered TESDA Accredited Courses
2014 – Offered Bachelor of Science in Medical Laboratory Science and Bachelor of Science in Pharmacy

Current Status of Accredited Programs:

BS Nursing – Level IV Re-Accredited Status
BS Biology – Level III Re-Accredited Status
BS Hospitality Management – Level II Accredited Status
BS Radiologic Technology – Level II Accredited Status (First in the Philippines); 2nd top-performing Radiologic Technology School in the Philippines
BS Physical Therapy – Level I Accredited Status
BS Psychology – Level I Accredited Status
Doctor of Optometry – Level I Accredited Status

Academic programs
Source:

Basic education 

Senior High School ( Grade 11 to Grade 12)
Academic Track:
Accountancy, Business and Management (ABM)
Science, Technology, and Mathematics (STEM)
Humanities and Social Sciences (HUMSS)
General Academic Strand (GAS)
Technical, Vocational & Livelihood (TVL)

Higher education 

Bachelor of Science in Radiologic Technology
Bachelor of Science in Medical Laboratory Science
Bachelor of Science in Hospitality Management
Doctor of Optometry
Bachelor of Science in Biology
Bachelor of Science in Nursing
Bachelor of Science in Entrepreneurship
Bachelor of Science in Occupational Therapy
Bachelor of Science in Physical Therapy
Bachelor of Science in Psychology 
Bachelor of Science in Tourism Management
Bachelor of Science in Pharmacy

Graduate Program 
Master of Arts in Nursing

Gallery

References

External links 
 

Educational institutions established in 1975
Nursing schools in the Philippines
Universities and colleges in Davao City